Les Visiteurs du Soir (US: The Devil's Envoys) is a 1942 film by French film director Marcel Carné. The film was released on 5 December 1942 in Paris during the Nazi occupation.

Plot
In May 1485, two of the devil's envoys, Gilles (Alain Cuny) and Dominique (Arletty), arrive at the castle of Baron Hugues (Fernand Ledoux) on the night of a celebration for his daughter's engagement. The Baron's daughter, Anne (Marie Déa), is set to marry Renaud (Marcel Herrand), a warlord who prefers talking about battle more than reciting love poems. Disguised as traveling minstrels, Gilles and Dominique enter the castle and use their powers of enticement to ruin the upcoming nuptials. Gilles seduces the innocent Anne, while both the Baron and Renaud become bewitched with Dominique. But, when Gilles accidentally falls in love with Anne, the Devil (Jules Berry) arrives to ensure that any true happiness is destroyed. When Gilles and Anne are caught together in her room, Gilles is thrown into the dungeon, and Anne and Renaud's engagement is called off.

When the Baron and Renaud realize that they are both in love with Dominique, they duel to the death and Renaud is killed. Following the Devil's orders, Dominique leaves the castle and entices the Baron to follow her in suit. Intrigued by Anne's unusual purity and faith in love, the Devil decides he wants Anne for himself. Making a deal with the Devil, Anne agrees to be with him in return for the Devil releasing Gilles from chains. Once Gilles is free, the Devil strips Gilles of his memory and Gilles walks off leaving Anne with the Devil. But, once Gilles is gone, Anne reveals that she lied and that she could never love the Devil. Returning to the fountain where she and Gilles first pronounced their love, Anne and Gilles reunite and through the power of love, Gilles recovers his memory. Finding the two once again in love, the Devil changes them both into statues, but finds that, even underneath stone, their hearts continue to beat.

Cast
 Arletty as Dominique, a minstrel
 Alain Cuny as Gilles, a minstrel
 Jules Berry as the Devil
 Marie Déa as Anne Hugues
 Fernand Ledoux as Baron Hugues, Anne's father
 Marcel Herrand as Baron Renaud, Anne's fiance
 Pierre Labry as the Lord
 Jean d'Yd as the playboy
 Roger Blin as the monster showman
 Gabriel Gabrio as the executioner
 Simone Signoret as plain maid made beautiful by Gilles

Production
The film was shot in Nice, in Vichy France, and due to the war, Carné faced a number of difficulties in making the film. Due to the increased censorship during the war, Carné wanted to make a historical and fantastical film that would have little difficulty with the censors.

Reception
The film premiered at Paris’s Madeleine Cinema on 4 December 1942 and was one of the biggest film events during the war. It was called "the grandest film of the Occupation." One of the reasons that the film was such a huge success was murmuring before the film was released that the film was an allegory for the current situation. Many people saw the character of the Devil as representing Hitler and the continued beating hearts of the lovers as representing France living under German rule, but not giving up hope. Carné maintained until his death that the film was not an intentional allegory for the war and that any relationship was purely unconscious.

References

External links
 
 
 
 Les visiteurs du soir: Love in the Ruins an essay by Michael Atkinson at the Criterion Collection

1942 films
French black-and-white films
Films directed by Marcel Carné
French romantic fantasy films
1940s romantic fantasy films
Films with screenplays by Jacques Prévert
Films set in the 1480s
The Devil in film
1940s French-language films
1940s French films